Endless Renovation is the second studio album by SubArachnoid Space, released on June 23, 1998 by Release Entertainment.

Track listing

Personnel 
Adapted from the Endless Renovation liner notes.

SubArachnoid Space
 Chris Van Huffel – drums
 Melynda Jackson – guitar, tape, vocals
 Mason Jones – guitar
Additional musicians
 Arusha Baker – hammered dulcimer (5)
 John Trevor Bensonon – double bass (5)
 A.L. Dentel – cello (5, 6)
 Kris Force – violin (5)

Additional musicians (cont.)
 Anthony Petrovic – synthesizer (6)
 Jason Stein – bass guitar (1, 5, 6)
 Andey Koa Stephens – organ and bass guitar (1-4)
Production and additional personnel
 Myles Boisen – recording
 Matthew F. Jacobson – executive producer
 Kime Joan – photography
 Jeff Mann – mastering
 Bill Yurkiewicz – executive producer

Release history

References

External links 
 Endless Renovation at Bandcamp
 Endless Renovation at Discogs (list of releases)

1998 albums
SubArachnoid Space albums
Relapse Records albums